Marit Øiseth (29 December 1928 – 5 October 1971) was a Norwegian sprinter and cross-country skier of the 1940s and 1950s who participated in the 1952 Winter Olympics, held in Oslo.

Born Marit Hemstad in Nord-Odal, a municipality in Norway's southeastern county of Hedmark. She never participated in the Summer Olympics, but finished fourth at the 1946 European Championships at Bislett stadion in a personal best time for the 200m of 25.7 seconds. This remained her career best time. She never became Norwegian champion, but women were not included in the Norwegian championships before 1947.

She attained the opportunity to represent her country when the Norwegian capital served as the host city for that year's Winter Olympics. She ultimately finished seventh in the 10 km event.

Marit Øiseth died in her hometown of Nord-Odall twelve weeks before her 43rd birthday.

Cross-country skiing results

Olympic Games

World Championships

References

External links
Marit Øiseth data at the SR/Olympic Sports website

1928 births
1971 deaths
Norwegian female cross-country skiers
Olympic cross-country skiers of Norway
Cross-country skiers at the 1952 Winter Olympics
People from Nord-Odal
Norwegian female sprinters
Sportspeople from Innlandet